The women's openweight competition in sumo at the 2009 World Games took place on 18 July 2009 at the Kaohsiung Senior High School Gymnasium in Kaohsiung, Taiwan.

Competition format
A total of 47 athletes entered the competition. They fought in the cup system with repechages.

Results

1/48 finals

1/32 finals

1/16 finals

Quarterfinals

Semifinals

Finals

References